Lefferts Manor Historic District is a national historic district in Prospect Lefferts Gardens, Brooklyn, New York City.  It consists of 667 contributing buildings and one contributing site (the elaborate garden at 95 Maple), which were built between 1896 and 1935 on the subdivision established by James Lefferts in 1896.  It consists entirely of single-family residential buildings, most of which are stone, brick, or brick and stone rowhouses.  The district also includes a number of free-standing frame and masonry residences and garages.

It was listed on the National Register of Historic Places in 1992, with a boundary increase in 2017.

References

Lefferts family
Flatbush, Brooklyn
Historic districts on the National Register of Historic Places in Brooklyn